Saigaun is a village development committee in Banke District in Lumbini Province of south-western Nepal. At the time of the 1991 Nepal census it had a population of 4,745 and had 857 houses in the town.

References

Populated places in Banke District